The African Space Agency (AfSA) is a regional organisation established by the African Union (AU) to promote cooperation between the space policies of the AU's member states. The AU adopted a space strategy in 2016, and agreed upon the statute underlying AfSA in 2018. In 2019 Egypt was declared the host, and the organisation was established in January 2023 through an agreement between Egypt and the AU. The headquarters of the African Space Agency will be hosted in Cairo, alongside the Egyptian Space Agency (EGSA).

History
Numerous unrelated space initiatives have emerged among and between various African Union countries. The Regional African Satellite Communication Organization was an early regional initiative, launched in 1992 with 45 members and achieved limited success. Two African Regional Centres for Space Science and Technology Education were set up in 1998, an English-speaking one in Nigeria and a French-speaking one in Morocco. A proposed African Resource Management (ARM) satellite constellation joint project was proposed around 2000, and founded in 2003 by Algeria, Kenya, Nigeria, and South Africa. The first formal partnerships were agreed upon in 2009. Nigeria then launched NigSat-2 with the intention it be part of this constellation. The first national space agencies among African Union states were the National Space Research and Development Agency of Nigeria, the Algerian Space Agency, and the South African National Space Agency. All operated in the early 21st century, alongside space programmes from other states.

Discussions about setting up a pan-African space agency began around this period. Planning was inspired by the European Space Agency. The idea of such a space agency was included in the AU's 2009–2012 strategic plan. An August 2010 declaration from the Third African Union (AU) Conference of Ministers in charge of Communications and Information Technologies directed the African Union Commission to look into developing such an agency alongside a dedicated space policy. The idea was supported the next month in a joint statement with the European Commission. A September 2011 statement from the African Leadership Conference on Space Science and Technology for Sustainable Development states cooperation could occur before a pan-African institution was established. A 2012 meeting of the same AU Conference of Ministers reiterated the call for an AU space policy. By 2014, a draft policy had been developed.

An African Space Policy and Strategy was adopted in January 2016. The AU continued to discuss development with the European Space Agency. Officials also met with the European Union Agency for the Space Programme. During 2016 there were 20 national civilian space agencies and departments.

The Statute of the African Space Agency was adopted in January 2018. Bids to host the agency came from Egypt, Ethiopia, Namibia, and Nigeria. A bid from Ghana arrived too late, and Namibia later withdrew its bid. The February 2019 32nd African Union Summit saw a resolution passed to create a headquarters for the agency which would be based in Egypt. It was intended that operations would begin in 2022. Egypt supported its bid by pledging $10 million to AfSA.

A final agreement was signed with host country Egypt on 24 January 2023, with the coutry agreeing to turn over the finished building to the institution by the end of the year. AfSA will be opened in three phases throughout 2023.

As of early 2023 when the AfSA was instituted, under 50 satellites are currently controlled by African states; mostly Algeria, Angola, Egypt, Kenya, Morocco, Nigeria, and South Africa.

Location
The headquarters has been built in Egypt's Space City, alongside the Egyptian Space Agency (EGSA), located near the capital Cairo. This site is intended to support other space-related buildings, including research buildings and satellite manufacturing plants.

A Pan-African University of Space Science and Technology is expected to be set up in South Africa and support AfSA, although this initiative has stalled.

Aims
The agency was officially founded to promote policy and strategy cooperation and coordination within the African Union member states. It is intended to have a coordination role, rather than being directly involved with satellite production and space launches.

The establishment of the agency is seen as a positive contribution to the AU's Agenda 2063, with the AU's space policy and strategy being one of 15 key programmes within the agenda.

References

External links
 Statute of the African Space Agency (other languages)
 African Space Policy, African Union (2016)
 African Space Strategy, African Union (2019)

Organisations based in Cairo
Organizations established in 2023
Space agencies
2023 establishments in Africa